KOHL (89.3 FM) is a radio station broadcasting a Contemporary Hit Radio format.

It is licensed to Fremont, California, United States. The station is currently owned by the Ohlone Community College District and is the primary instructional facility for the Ohlone College Radio Broadcast program.

History

1972 to 1984
89.3 KOHL signed on in 1972 as a 10 watt FM station. A residential house located on the Ohlone College Fremont  campus served as home to both the studios and transmitter.  The KOHL logo reflected this.  The logo consisted of  KOHL in bold lettering at the top, a house in the middle, and "Ohlone College" written at the bottom.  Adjacent to  the back of the house was an antenna.  This is very similar to how things really were at the facility.  The  transmitter sat in the fireplace of the house.  A line of coaxial cable took the signal from the transmitter up  through the chimney and then over to the tower.

In 1981 KOHL adopted a CHR format, shedding its previous free-form  typical college radio sound.

1984 to 1992
In 1984 KOHL was granted an increase in power by the FCC moving the station up to 100 watts ERP.  The transmitter  remained in building 29, while the studios were moved into building 4 on the Ohlone College campus.  In 1992 KOHL was once again granted an increase in power, bringing the station to 145 watts ERP.  The transmitter was moved from building 29 to Mission Ridge.  The move in power and location gave KOHL a much farther-reaching signal that could  be heard from as far north as Oakland to San Jose in the south bay.  This configuration remains today.

1992 to the present
In October 1995 the Gary Soren Smith Center for the Fine and Performing Arts was officially opened at the Ohlone  College Fremont Campus.  The Smith Center consists of two theater venues, a dance studio, an amphitheater, and a  broadcasting complex.  The second floor of the broadcasting complex was specifically designed for KOHL (the first  floor houses Ohlone College's TV station, ONTV).  The facility consists of four studios, support offices, an  engineering center and a classroom.  In addition to moving into brand new custom studios, KOHL also made the move  to the RCS Master Control digital radio platform, which ultimately became an industry standard.  KOHL was one of the  earliest west coast broadcast facilities to make the transition and was often used by the RCS company as a showcase  for the product.  In 2005 KOHL converted from the DOS based RCS Master Control system to the Windows XP version.

Branding
In 1999 the branding and imaging of KOHL received an overhaul to better adapt the station for the modern radio industry, the old slogan of “The Best Music!” was retired and replaced with “Music. Attitude.”, the imaging between songs took on a more aggressive sound.
Often using agro rock or industrial music underneath the station voice became heavily processed and more drops from television and movies were worked into the production, the logo was changed as well moving from a two-color handwriting type font to a larger bolder faced offset stacked.
The three color of red, white, and black logo with "89.3" on the top and "KOHL" on the bottom.

KOHL as an educational broadcasting program
KOHL as a whole is the primary working lab of the Radio Broadcasting Program at Ohlone College in Fremont,  California, providing real-world, hands-on experience to students.  The program is a career-oriented, operations-intensive curriculum featuring the latest technology. Lecture and lab situations (both on air and off) combine to  provide students with the background and skills required to meet the needs of the radio communications industry. The program features both analog and digital studio systems, including digital multitrack production techniques. The curriculum is presented by industry professionals and is designed to focus on the business of radio  broadcasting. The station's format is high energy contemporary hit radio which challenges students to refine  commercial broadcast techniques in a professional environment.

Courses can be found under "Broadcasting (BRDC)" in  the Ohlone College Catalog and Class Schedule. Ohlone offers an Associate in Arts degree in Broadcasting. Also  available are Fast Track Certificates in Radio Broadcasting Studio Operations, Air Talent, Program Management, and  Digital Production.

Promotions 
Every year KOHL broadcasts from the Fremont Festival of the Arts on both days of the festival. "KOHL's Ultimate Prom" gives listeners everything they need for prom and usually includes a dress, hair and  makeup, tux rental, dinner, and flowers. KOHL airs a weekly countdown show Saturday nights called the KOHL Top 10 @ 10.  Listeners can win prizes by  reciting the entire Top 10 list after it has been revealed on air. The station often gives away concert tickets and DVDs.

Past promotions
Simpsons Season 9 Slots: Listeners had to identify three Simpsons characters to win a Simpsons Season 9 box set.

Simon Said:  Listeners had to guess what Simon Cowell had said about American Idol finalists to win tickets to  the American Idol live tour.

Chick or Treat: Listeners either won tickets to see a female performer (the chick) or food at local restaurants (the  treat).  The concert tickets were for Kelly Clarkson and Gwen Stefani.

The Singing Bee-Yonce: Listeners had to complete Beyoncé lyrics to win tickets to see Beyoncé.

Matchbox 20 Matchups:  Listeners had to predict the winner of a matchup to win tickets to see Matchbox Twenty. Matchups included "a shark with lasers vs. a monkey driving a pickup truck," "Arnold Schwarzenegger vs. a puppy,"  and "Chuck Norris vs Godzilla with a chainsaw."

External links
 KOHL Radio website

OHL
Contemporary hit radio stations in the United States
Radio stations established in 1972
Companies based in Fremont, California